Ledfeather is a 2008 novel by Native American author Stephen Graham Jones, published by FC2 (Fiction Collective Two).

Plot summary
A young Blackfoot man discovers the 1883 letters of an Indian Agent, whose decisions have "impacted the lives of generations of Blackfeet Indians." As the novel progresses, it is shown that this young man, Doby Saxon, and the Indian Agent may be the same soul inhabiting two separate bodies, and the Indian Agent has been forced to live in the future on the same reservation still plagued by the consequences of his decision.

Characters
 Doby Saxon  a Blackfoot living on the Blackfeet Indian Reservation
 Francis Dalimpere  1883 Indian Agent for the Blackfeet. 
 Malory Sainte  Doby's mother. 
 Claire Dalimpere  Francis's wife, the recipient of his letters. 
 Yellow Tail  1883 Chief for the Blackfeet. 
 Lead Feather  a young boy found by Francis, who has attempted to commit suicide.

Motifs
"Cyclical stuff, iterations, rhythm (which is just repetition with variance)—I can’t seem to stay away from it," was the author's comment in a 2008 interview with Rain Taxi online.

Reception 
Foreword Reviews described the work as "hallucinogenic lyricism and a nonlinear narrative."

Lit Pub reviewer Edward J. Rathke found the novel to be a remedy for heartbreak: "The next thing I knew, the sun was rising and my heart was breaking, but in a good way, the way that resurrects you, that shows you everything you forgot to pay attention to, forgot to remember, and I closed it because it was done, again, finished for the third time, and I could’ve turned back to page one and began again, which is how the first two readings happened, in consecutive days, because this book burns you, burrows deep, and smolders, lives, reconnects cells, and balances chemistry."

See also
The Fast Red Road: A Plainsong (2000)
All The Beautiful Sinners (2003)
The Bird is Gone: A Manifesto (2003)
Bleed Into Me (2005)
Demon Theory (2006)
The Long Trial of Nolan Dugatti (2008)

References 

Novels by Stephen Graham Jones
2008 American novels
Native American novels
Blackfeet Nation
Nonlinear narrative novels
FC2 books